Cölner Hofbräu Früh (or just Früh) is a private brewery for top-fermented beer called Kölsch. The brewery was founded in Cologne in 1904 by Peter Joseph Früh. Since 1987, the beer is no longer brewed directly in the house, but in a brewing facility in Cologne-Feldkassel. The former brewery area and the former living quarters of the Früh family were redesigned and restored. In the medieval vaults of the fermentation and storage cellars, new guest rooms were created and on the second floor the Hofbräustuben for more sophisticated tastes.

In March 2019, Früh announced a cooperation with the company Haus Kölscher Brautradition GmbH. The subsidiary of the Radeberger Group will have all bottled beers produced at Früh's Feldkassel brewery from 2020 and all draft beers of the Sion, Gilden, Peters, Dom, Sester, and Küppers Kölsch brands from 2021.

References

External links
Cölner Hofbräu Früh  
Früh Gastronomy

Food and drink companies established in 1904
Breweries in Germany
Beer brands of Germany
Manufacturing companies based in Cologne
1904 establishments in Germany